Fanny Chmelar (born 31 October 1985) is a German former alpine skier. Born in Weilheim in Oberbayern, she appeared in her first FIS Alpine Ski World Cup in the 2004–05 season. In her career, she had one World Cup podium finish, a second place in the slalom at Åre, Sweden in 2009. She competed for Germany at the 2010 Winter Olympics.

Chmelar retired from professional skiing in 2013.

References

External links
 Website von Fanny Chmelar Chmelar's official website 
 
 

1985 births
Living people
Olympic alpine skiers of Germany
Alpine skiers at the 2010 Winter Olympics
German female alpine skiers
21st-century German women